Phacusa chalcobasis is a moth of the family Zygaenidae. It was described by George Hampson in 1919. It is found on Sumatra in Indonesia.

References

Moths described in 1919
Procridinae